The 34th Weapons Squadron is a United States Air Force unit.  It is assigned to the USAF Weapons School, stationed at Nellis Air Force Base, Nevada.

The mission of the squadron is to provide HH-60 Pave Hawk instructional flying for air rescue missions.

History

Rescue operations
The squadron was first activated at Kadena Air Base, Okinawa on 17 October 1952, when Air Rescue Service expanded its existing squadrons into groups and replaced their flights with new squadrons.  The squadron absorbed the mission, personnel and equipment of D Flight of the  2d Air Rescue Squadron.  The 34th flew the Boeing SB-29 Super Dumbo, a rescue version of the B-29.  Its Super Dumbos accompanied Boeing B-29 Superfortresses of Twentieth Air Force, providing strike force rescue escort for bombers flying combat missions to Korea until combat operations ceased in July 1953.  The squadron also flew search and rescue missions in the Okinawa area.

The 34th participated in "Duckbutt" missions, flying rescue and recovery orbits to assist damaged or lost aircraft recovering to Japan after missions during the Korean War.  The SB-29 dropped wooden boats and parajumpers to recover lost aircrew. With the reduction of US forces in the Pacific following the end of hostilities in Korea, the 34th was inactivated on 8 September 1954.

Advanced training
The USAF Weapons School HH-60G Division had its origins in the establishment of the USAF Combat Rescue School at Nellis Air Force Base, Nevada in 1993. In 1995, Air Combat Command consolidated the mission of the Rescue School within the 57th Wing. On 7 July 1995, the HH-60G Division of the USAF Weapons School was organized.   In 2003, the division was replaced by the 34th Weapons Squadron, which became an instructional squadron at the Weapons School, equipped with HH-60 Pave Hawk for PJ and helicopter pilot rescue training.

Lineage
 Constituted as the 34th Air Rescue Squadron on 17 October 1952
 Activated on 14 November 1952
 Inactivated on 8 September 1954
 Redesignated 34th Weapons Squadron on 24 January 2003
 Activated on 3 February 2003

Assignments
 2d Air Rescue Group, 14 November 1952 – 8 September 1954 (attached to Twentieth Air Force, 1 June 1953 – 31 July 1954)
 USAF Weapons School, 3 February 2003 – present

Stations
 Kadena Air Base, Okinawa, 14 November 1952 – 8 September 1954
 Nellis Air Force Base, Nevada, 3 February 2003 – present

Aircraft
 Boeing SB-29 Super Dumbo, 1952–1954
 Sikorsky H-5 Dragonfly, 1952–1954
 Sikorsky H-19 Chickasaw, 1952–1953
 Douglas C-47 Skytrain, 1952–1954
 Douglas SC-47 Skytrain, 1952–1954

References

Notes
 Explanatory notes

 Citations

Bibliography

 

Weapons 0034